Moreau Township is a township in Morgan County, in the U.S. state of Missouri.

Moreau Township takes its name from South Moreau Creek.

References

Townships in Missouri
Townships in Morgan County, Missouri